Argyria supposita is a moth in the family Crambidae. It was described by Harrison Gray Dyar Jr. in 1914. It is found in Mexico.

References

Argyriini
Moths described in 1914
Moths of Central America